The Miss Hong Kong Pageant 2022 was the 50th Miss Hong Kong Pageant which was held on September 25, 2022. This pageant marks the 50th anniversary of the Miss Hong Kong Pageant since its acquisition by TVB in 1973. Miss Hong Kong 2021 winner Sabina Mendes de Assunção (宋宛穎) crowned Denice Lam (林鈺洧) at the end of the pageant.

The official recruitment process started on 17 April 2022 and concluded on 22 May 2022. 

The semifinal was originally scheduled to be held on 4 September 2022. However, due to #9 Cherry Chan, #10 Ceci Ho, #13 Sharon Ying, #18 Maggie Ho and #19 Stacia Yeung contracting COVID-19, the semifinal was postponed until further notice and TVB finally decided to cancel the semi-finals on 31 August. 19 contestants all appeared in the finals on 25 September 2022.

Results 
Placements

Special Awards

Miss Friendship:  #13 Sharon Ying  
Miss International Goodwill: #4 Cecca Xu
Miss Photogenic: #14 Joey Leung
The following awards were given during sponsor or promotion event:

Audience Most Like Contestants: #2 Hebe Lam, #9 Cherry Chan, #14 Joey Leung and #19 Stacia Yeung 
Best Makeup Award: #4 Cecca Xu 
Environmental Conservation Ambassador Award: #4 Cecca Xu 
Netizens Most Like KOL: #8 Denice Lam 
Most Eloquent Award: #4 Cecca Xu, #11 Yohanna Fung, #14 Joey Leung and #17 Janice Cheung

Contestants

Elimination chart

Judges

References

External links 

 Official Website

Miss Hong Kong Pageants
2022 in Hong Kong
Hong Kong